The following outline is provided as an overview of and topical guide to vehicles:

Vehicle – non-living means of transportation.  Vehicles are most often human-made, although some other means of transportation which are not made by humans can also be called vehicles; examples include icebergs and floating tree trunks.

Types of vehicles

 Aerosani
 All-terrain vehicle
 Amphibious all-terrain vehicle
 Amphibious vehicle
 Auto rickshaw
 Bathyscaphe
 Cable car
 Catamaran
 Coach (bus)
 Coach (carriage)
 Cycle rickshaw
 Dandy horse
 Deep Submergence Vehicle
 Diver Propulsion Vehicle
 Diving bell
 Diving chamber
 Dog sled
 Draisine
 Electric vehicle
 Golf cart
 Ground effect vehicle
 Handcar
 Hopper 
 Hovercraft
 Jet ski
 Kick scooter
 Land yacht
 Launch escape capsule
 Locomotive
 Maglev
 Minibus
 Minivan
 Monorail
 Monowheel
 Moped
 Narrow-track vehicle
 Omni Directional Vehicle
 Ornithopter
 Passenger car
 Rickshaw
 Pedalo
 Pogo Stick 
 Powered parachute
 Quadracycle
 Race car
 Road train
 Rocket
 Rocket sled
 Rover
 Screw-propelled vehicle
 Sea tractor
 Single-track vehicle
 Tilting trike

Aircraft 

Aircraft
 Airplane
 Airship
 Autogyro
 Balloon (aeronautics)
 Blimp
 Fixed-wing aircraft
 Glider aircraft
 Ground effect vehicle
 Hang glider
 Helicopter
 Jet aircraft
 Jet pack
 Wingpack
Powered parachute
 Ornithopter
 Rocket
 Escape capsule
 Unmanned aerial vehicle

Landcraft 

Landcraft
All terrain vehicle
Amphibious all-terrain vehicle
Amphibious vehicle
Automobile
Autorickshaw
Aerosani
Bicycle
Bus
Cable car
Car
Coach (bus)
Coach (carriage)
Cycle rickshaw
Dandy horse
Dog sled
Draisine
Electric vehicle
Golf cart
Kick scooter
Landship
Narrow-track vehicle
Maglev
Military vehicle
Minibus
Minivan
Monorail
Motorcycle
Motorhome
Monowheel
Moped
Off-road vehicle
Scooter (motorcycle)
Segway Personal Transporter
Passenger car
Pickup truck
Pogo stick
Omni directional vehicle
Quadracycle
Single-track vehicle
Skateboard
Screw propelled vehicle
Sedan
Semi-trailer truck
Sled
Snowboard
Snowmobile
Space Hopper
Sports car
Steam car
Street legal vehicle
Sport utility vehicle
Tilting trike
Tank
Tractor
Traction engine
Race car
Recreational vehicle
Road train
Rickshaw
Land yacht
Locomotive
Rocket sled
Rover
Train
Tram
Tricycle
Trolleybus
Truck
Unicycle
Van
Velocipede
Velomobile
Wagon
Wheelbarrow 
Wheelchair

Watercraft 

Watercraft
Bathyscape
Boat
Catamaran
Deep submergence vehicle
Diving Bell
Diving chamber
Canoe
Hovercraft
Hydrofoil
Kayak
Pedalo
Jet ski
Sailboat
Sea tractor
Ship
Submarine
Submersible
Surfboard 
Yacht

Spacecraft 

Spacecraft
Lander
Launch vehicle
Rocket
Satellite
Spaceplane
Spaceship
Space station

Hypothetical vehicles
In works of either fiction of hypothetical science, certain vehicle had been imagined to transport people and/or cargo beyond the traditional domains of land, sea, air and space. Of which time travel is the most popular. However, traveling between dimensions has also been seen as an alternative to time travel.

Timecraft 

Timecraft
Time machine

History of vehicles

 History of the automobile
 History of the bicycle
 History of the electric vehicle
 History of motorcycles
 History of steam road vehicles

General vehicle-related concepts
 Detroit
 Fuel efficiency

Vehicle-related lists
 List of aircraft
 List of bicycle types
 List of cars
 List of locomotives
 List of military vehicles
 List of ships
 List of spacecraft
 List of truck types
 List of vehicle instruments

See also

 Outline of transport
 Outline of transport planning

References

External links

Vehicles
Vehicles

Vehicles, Outline of